Dom Luís de Vasconcelos e Sousa, 3rd Count of Castelo Melhor (1636 – 15 August 1720) was a Portuguese politician and prime minister.

Career
Castelo Melhor was a Portuguese royal favourite who, as an effective governor of Portugal from 1662 to 1667 during the reign of Afonso VI, was responsible for the successful prosecution of the war against Spain, which led to Spanish recognition of Portugal's new ruling dynasty in 1668.

Shortly after Afonso VI's coming-of-age in 1662, Castelo Melhor saw an opportunity to gain power at court by befriending the mentally unstable king. He managed to convince the king that his mother, Luisa of Medina-Sidonia, was out to steal his throne and exile him from Portugal. As a result, Afonso took control of the throne and his mother was sent to a convent.

The King appointed Castelo Melhor his secret notary (escrivão da puridade), a position in which the favourite was able to exercise the functions of first minister.

Castelo Melhor overcame the difficulties which had hitherto beset Portugal in the war against Spain, reorganizing the troops (now reinforced by an English contingent by virtue of the English king Charles II's marriage to Catherine of Braganza) and entrusting their command to competent generals. Consequently, the Portuguese Restoration War entered a victorious phase for Portugal (1663–65) and Spain began peace negotiations.

Agreement proved difficult to attain and meanwhile the internal political situation in Portugal deteriorated. Castelo Melhor and his Francophile party were losing ground to the Anglophile party. The king was obliged to dismiss Castelo Melhor on 9 September 1667, in a palace coup organized by the king's wife Maria Francisca of Nemours and brother Pedro . Shortly afterwards, the king himself was also deprived of power.

Castelo Melhor went into exile in Paris and then London, but in 1685 he was permitted to return to Portugal and, two years after that, to court. On the accession of John V (1706), he was appointed a councillor of state and he continued to occupy a position of distinction until his death in 1720.

He was also the 12th captain-major of Santa Maria Island in the Azores from 1667 to 1720.

Vasconcelos e Sousa Luis
Count of Castelo Melhor
Count of Castelo Melhor
Portuguese nobility
Count of Castelo Melhor
17th-century Portuguese people
Luis
18th-century Portuguese people
Royal favourites